The Great Wall Sing is a full-size SUV produced by Great Wall Motors.

Overview

As the SUV version of the Great Wall Sailor, the body of the Great Wall Sing was the LWB 5-door Isuzu MU/Chevrolet Grand LUV wagon produced under license with a redesigned front end heavily resembling a Nissan Paladin/Frontier.

References

External links

Official website

Great Wall Motors vehicles
Cars introduced in 2005
Full-size sport utility vehicles
Rear-wheel-drive vehicles